A. abbreviata may refer to:
 Achatinella abbreviata, an extinct colorful tropical tree-living air-breathing land snail species
 Abolboda abbreviata, a flowering plant species in the genus Abolboda
 Aechmea abbreviata, a plant species endemic to Ecuador